Tum Hi Ho Bandhu Sakha Tumhi is an Indian television series, which premiered on 11 May 2015 on Zee TV.  Neil Bhatt, Kabeer Kumar,  Sreejita De and Chandini bhagwanani were in lead roles. The show is set in Agra.

Tum Hi Ho Bandhu Sakha Tumhi is a tale of a family of five brothers and three sisters.

The show began with the working title Pethawala before being named  Tum Hi Ho Bandhu Sakha Tumhi.
The show ended due to low ratings. It was replaced by Kaala Teeka.

From 17 July 2016, it was rerun on Zee Anmol as Choti Bahu - Parivar ki Jeevan Rekha. The show there ended on 11 November 2016.

Plot
The story revolves around the Pethewala family. Bhushan, the second son of the family is in love with Shreya. Before he can tell his family, they pretend to have fixed his marriage elsewhere but the girl turns out to be Shreya. The lovers are happily married.
 
Ajay is the youngest son of the Pethewala family. His best friend Ajju is in love with Sanjana. Ajju gets a job in USA and he and Sanjana decide to marry in the court given Sanjana's father's objections. Being just under 21 years of age, Ajju cannot marry. To stop Sanjana's father from getting her married forcibly to someone else, Ajju requests Ajay to marry her till he returns from the US.

Ajay marries Sanjana. Unknown to their families is that their marriage is a contract for a few months. The Pethewala family takes time to accept Sanjana. Meanwhile, Shreya, after getting brain washed by her mother, wants to divide the house and gain control over it. Sanjana discovers Shreya's true colours and tries to expose her. But Shreya exposes the truth behind Ajay's marriage. This creates huge problems in the family and Sanjana is thrown out of the house. Trilokchand asks Ajay to go for a divorce. But Sanjana's father, who has already accepted the marriage makes her realise her love for Ajay. Ajay likes Sanjana but hides his feelings as he does not want to hurt Ajju. Sanjana tries to win Ajay's love. Meanwhile, Dadi realises Shreya's true face. She brings back Sanjana to the house as a negative person. Sanjana tortures the family so the torn apart family will cooperate to fight her. She finally exposes Shreya who is thrown out by Bhushan.

Shreya tries to commit suicide by jumping off from the cliff. Bhushan saves her but she loses her vision and becomes blind. Shreya regrets her mistakes and asks forgiveness from the family. Everyone forgives her except Bhushan. At the same time Ajju returns from USA. Ajju learns of Sanjana's love for Ajay. He tries to drag her out of the house but Ajay stops him and confesses his love for her. This creates a huge fight between the friends. Ajju tries to rape Sanjana, when Ajay's sister Mishri saves her by hitting Ajju on his head with a vase. Ajju dies and Mishri gets scared. Ajay and Sanjana hide Ajju's body. The cops come by and tell Trilokchand that they've discovered Ajju's body and that the entire Pethewala family are suspects in the murder, but Ajay and Sanjana are the main suspects. In college, Mishri notices that she is being followed. It is actually Ajju in disguise. Ajju's sister Shaina, Ajju and even Shreya try and manipulate Mishri into thinking she's going mad but Ajay and Sanjana protect her. In the meantime, Shreya has faked a pregnancy to stay in the family but Bhushan suspects her and discovers her lies. Ajay and Mishri catch another man, Anuj, who claims to have fallen in love with Mishri at first sight. Anuj's family asks for Mishri's hand in marriage. On the day of the wedding, Sanjana is arrested for Ajju's murder. Sanjana confesses and the only way Ajay can save her is to marry Shaina. Finally Bhushan enters and exposes all the villains and made Sanjana and Ajay married. Shreya, Ajay and shaina are arrested. Sanjana requests Bhushan to bring Shreya home but he agrees. Shreya gets happy that Sanjana forgives her. The story ends with the whole family dancing.

Cast
 Chandni Bhagwanani as Sanjana Ajay Pethewala
 Kabeer Kumar as Ajay Pethewala
 Neil Bhatt as Bhushan Trilokchand Pethewala
 Sreejita De as Shreya Bhushan Pethewala 
 Dimple Jhangiani as Avni Pethawala
 Lavina Tandon as Shaina
 Madhu Malti Kapoor as Dadi
 Tushar Dalvi as Trilokchand Pethawala
 Aishwarya Narkar as Elaichi Trilokchand Pethawala
 Vineet Raina as Amar Pethawala
 Aalika Sheikh as Vinati Amar Pethawala
 Rehaan Khan as Samar Amar Pethawala
 Mahesh Tanwar as Utpal Trilokchand Pethawala
 Ravjeet Singh as Aayush Pethawala
 Neha Dangal as Mishri Trilokchand Pethawala 
 Neeraj Goswani as Ajju

References

2015 Indian television series debuts
Hindi-language television shows
Zee TV original programming
Shashi Sumeet Productions series
Television shows set in Agra